Monterongriffoli is a village in Tuscany, central Italy, located in the comune (municipality) of Montalcino, province of Siena. At the time of the 2001 census its population was 10.

References 

Frazioni of Montalcino